The 1996 Scott Tournament of Hearts Canadian women's national curling championship, was played February 17 to 25 at the Fort William Gardens in Thunder Bay, Ontario.

Ontario, skipped by Marilyn Bodogh won the title, defeating Alberta's Cheryl Kullman rink in the final. Ontario broke the game open with a three-ender in the sixth to go up 5–2. Alberta battled back to score 2 in the seventh, but lost a measurement in the 8th end, which would have tied the game at 5, but instead put them down 6–4. Ontario stole a point in the 9th to win the game, 7–4.

With the win, Bodogh and her team of Kim Gellard, Corie Beveridge and Jane Hooper Perroud earned the right to represent Canada at the 1996 World Women's Curling Championship and a berth in the 1997 Canadian Olympic Curling Trials. It was the second national championship for Bodogh, having previously won in 1986.

Teams

Standings

Results

Draw 1

Draw 2

Draw 3

Draw 4

Draw 5

Draw 6

Draw 7

Draw 8

Draw 9

Draw 10

Draw 11

Draw 12

Draw 13

Draw 14

Draw 15

Draw 16

Draw 17

TieBreaker 1

TieBreaker 2

TieBreaker 3

Page playoffs

1 vs. 2

3 vs. 4

Semi-final

Final

References

Scotties Tournament of Hearts
Scott Tournament of Hearts
Scott Tournament Of Hearts, 1996
Sports competitions in Thunder Bay
Curling in Northern Ontario
1996 in women's curling
February 1996 sports events in Canada